Jack Lewis (1902 – 13 March 1983) was an Irish equestrian. He competed in two events at the 1948 Summer Olympics. Lewis later became the chair of the Show Jumping Association of Ireland and its first Director General.

References

External links
 

1902 births
1983 deaths
Irish male equestrians
Olympic equestrians of Ireland
Equestrians at the 1948 Summer Olympics
Sportspeople from Limerick (city)